Tyson Bagent (born June 8, 2000) is an American football quarterback who most recently played for the Shepherd Rams.

Early life and high school
Bagent grew up in Martinsburg, West Virginia and attended Martinsburg High School, where he played football and basketball. He was named the West Virginia Gatorade Player of the Year after passing for 41 touchdowns. Bagent finished his high school career with 7,800 passing yards and 112 touchdown passes. Bagent was recruited by Division I Football Championship Subdivision Robert Morris and Albany, but committed to play college football at Division II Shepherd University.

College career
Bagent became the starting quarterback for the Shepherd Rams as a freshman and was named first team All-Mountain East Conference (MEC) after completing 253 of 387 pass attempts for 3,029 yards and 29 touchdowns. He was named second team All-Pennsylvania State Athletic Conference (PSAC) East, Shepherd's new athletic conference, after passing for 4,349 yards and 36 touchdowns. Bagent's junior season was cancelled due to Covid-19.

In 2021, Bagent passed for 5,000 yards and 53 touchdowns and was named the PSAC East Offensive Player of the Year and won the Harlon Hill Trophy. Bagent also won the Hardman Award as the best amateur athlete in West Virginia. After the season, Bagent entered the NCAA transfer portal and visited West Virginia and Maryland, but ultimately opted to stay at Shepherd for his final season of eligibility.

On December 3, 2022, Bagent broke the record for touchdown passes across all NCAA divisions with 158, in Shepherd's 4813 win over IUP during their quarterfinal game.

Bagent participated in the 2023 NFL Combine held March 3-6 at Lucas Oil Stadium in Indianapolis.

References

External links
Shepherd Rams profile

Living people
Players of American football from West Virginia
American football quarterbacks
Shepherd Rams football players
People from Martinsburg, West Virginia
Year of birth missing (living people)